This is a list of Sri Lankan Malays.

Sri Lankan Malay ( Shri Lanka Mæle Janathava (Standard);  Mæle Minissu / Ja Minissu (Colloquially);  are Sri Lankans with full or partial ancestry from the Indonesian Archipelago, Malaysia, or Singapore. In addition, people from Brunei and the Philippines also consider themselves Malays. The term is a misnomer as it is used as a historical catch-all term for all native ethnic groups of the Malay Archipelago who reside in Sri Lanka; the term does not apply solely to the ethnic Malays.

Demographics

Sri Lankan Malay    Population and Percentage     Population and Percentage

History
A significant Malay presence in Sri Lanka dates as far back as the 13th century, when Chandrabhanu Sridhamaraja, a Malay of Tambralinga, managed to occupy the northern part of the island in 1247; his followers assimilated into the local population. Many ancestors of present-day Sri Lankan Malays were soldiers posted by the Dutch, and later by the British, for the colonial administration of Sri Lanka, who decided to settle on the island. Other immigrants were convicts or members of noble houses from the Dutch East Indies (present-day Indonesia), who were exiled to Sri Lanka and who never left. The main source of a continuing Malay identity is their common Malay language, the Islamic faith, and their ancestral origin from the Malay Archipelago. Many Sri Lankan Malays have been celebrated as courageous soldiers, politicians, sportsmen, lawyers, accountants, and doctors.

Native Headmen of Ceylon
Native Headmen System was an integral part of the administration of the island of Ceylon (now known as Sri Lanka) under the successive European colonial powers, namely the Portuguese Empire, the Dutch East India Company and the British Empire. Native headmen or leaders were appointed by the European colonial administrators to function as intermediates between the Europeans and the native populous. During different periods through this system these headmen functioned in military, policing, administrative and ceremonial capacities. They served as translators, revenue collectors and wielded quasi-judicial powers. Much of the system evolved and changed over time until some of the last vestiges of it were removed in the post-independent Ceylon.

With the on set of British rule, Governor North restructured the native headmen system. The system was transformed into a salaried system with land grants and tenured service abolished. They became the second tier of the civil administration of the island with appointments made by the Government Agent of the Province. Appointments were non-transferable and usually hereditary, made to locals, usually from wealthy influential families loyal the British Crown. The holder had much control over the people of the area and had limited police powers since he was responsible to keep the peace, carry out revenue collection and assist in judicial functions. Over the next century, the headmen grew to be a powerful and affluent class consolidating economic power through land ownership and marriage. Gradually functions of headmen were transferred to various departments that were established by the British administration.

Following the formation of the State Council of Ceylon in 1931, one of its members, H. W. Amarasuriya, called for an inquiry into the Native Headman System. A commission was formed made up of retired civil servants and lawyers headed by H.M. Wedderburn. The commission reported on reforming the headman system or replacing it with transferable District Revenue Officers. The Native Headman System was abolished as an administrative system, with the titles of Mudaliyar (Mudali – මුදලි) and Muhandiram retained by government to be awarded as honors. This practice remained until suspension of Celanese honors in 1956. The minor headman positions were retained, surviving well into the 1970s when the posts of Vidane (විදානේ) in Low Country / Tamil Area and Town Arachchi (ටවුන් ආරච්චි) / Gan Arachchi (ගන් ආරච්චි) in Kandyan Area were replaced with the transferable post of Grama Niladhari (Village Officer).

“Peace Officer” includes Police Officer and the Headman of an area appointed in writing to perform police duties by the Government Agent of the Province by virtue of the powers vested in him by His Excellency the Governor.

List of Prominent Malay Headmen in the Low Country
The headmen system in the coastal and low country, evolved over time under the colonial administration of the Portuguese, the Dutch and then the British.

Head Mudaliyar Maha Mudaliyar (මහ මුදලි)
Head Mudaliyar was the head of the low country native headmen and native aide-de-camp to the Governor of Ceylon.

Korale Mudaliyar (Korale Mudali – කෝරලේ මුදලි)
Korale Mudaliyar was in-charge of an area known as a Korale and had several Muhandiram's under his supervision.
 Mudaliyar Baba Junoor Haji Bahar of Kalpitiya

Muhandiram (මුහන්දිරම්) 
A Muhandiram had several Vidane Arachchies under his supervision

Vidane Arachchi (විදානේ ආරච්චි)
A Vidane Arachchi had several Vidanes under his supervision

Vidane (විදානේ) 
A village or a group of small villages placed under his administration. Vidane was a Low Country headman ranking immediately below that of a Vidane Arachchi in Low Country and below that of a Udayar in Tamil Area in the Native Headmen System. A Vidane was equivalent in ranking to the Kandyan Areas headmen Town Arachchi or a Gan Arachchi

Vidane

Police Vidane
in charge of police duties in the Village under the supervision of the vidane

Vel Vidane
In charge of distributing water from the wewa (tank) to villagers for cultivation under the supervision of the vidane

Seeni Vidane
In charge of distributing Sugar under the supervision of the vidane

List of Prominent Malay Headmen in Tamil Areas
The Northern and Eastern provinces had the following classes of native headmen:

Atikar

Vanniyar (වන්නියා) (பண்டாரத்தார்)
Vanniar or Vanniyar had several Maniyagar under his supervision.

Maniyagar
Maniyagar had several Udayar's under his supervision
 Raden Matchjam Boorah Abu Cassim Miangar of Mannar

Udayar
Udayar had several Vidane's under his supervision

Vidane

Vidane
A village or a group of small villages placed under his administration. Vidane was a Low Country headman ranking immediately below that of a Vidane Arachchi in Low Country and below that of a Udayar in Tamil Area in the Native Headmen System. A Vidane was equivalent in ranking to the Kandyan Areas headmen Town Arachchi or a Gan Arachchi

Police Vidane
in charge of police duties in the Village under the supervision of the vidane

Vel Vidane
In charge of distributing water from the wewa (tank) to villagers for cultivation under the supervision of the vidane

Seeni Vidane
In charge of distributing Sugar under the supervision of the vidane

List of Prominent Malay Headmen in the Kandyan Areas
Following the Uva Rebellion in 1818 and changes to the administrative divisions of the island with the creation of Districts, British Government Agents (GA) took over the duties of the Dissava (with the remaining and newly appointed Dissavas being mere honorary titles), with Rate Mahatmaya becoming a subordinate to the local Government Agents and Assistant Government Agents. In the same way, after 1818 the position of the remaining and newly appointed Adigar (Maha Adigar or 1st Adigar) became mere honorary titles.

Adigar
An honorary appointment

Dissava
British Government Agent of the Province took over the duties of a  Dissava (with the remaining and newly appointed Dissavas being mere honorary appointments) in 1818. Rate Mahatmayas under his supervision

Rate Mahatmaya (රටෙි මහත්තයා) 
Rate Mahatmaya had several Korale Mahatmayas under his supervision.

Korale Mahaththaya (කෝරලේ මහත්තයා) 
Korale Mahattaya was in-charge of an area known as Korale and had several Gran Arachchis / Town Arachchis under his supervision.

Town Arachchi (ටවුන් ආරච්චි)
A Town Arachchi had a Town or group of small villages placed under his Administration

Gan Arachchi (ගන් ආරච්චි)
A Gan Arachchi had a village or group of small villages placed under his Administration

List of Prominent Malay Headmen Peace Officers
” Peace Officer” includes police officers and headmen appointed by the Government Agent of the Province in writing to perform police duties

Awarded as an honor (Titular)

List of Prominent Malay Gate Mudaliyar
 Gate Mudaliyar Baba Hakim Muthaliph (1779–1839) of Magampattuwa
 Gate Mudaliyar Baba Thajul Arifin Doole (1834–1909) of Hambantota

List of Prominent Malay Gate Muhandiram

List of Prominent Malay Gate Arachchi

List of Prominent Malay Veda Arachchi

Leading Business Persons

1820–1947

1948–1971

1972 to present

Politicians

Legislative Council of Ceylon (1833–1931)
 Tuan Burhanudeen Jayah (T. B. Jayah), member of Legislative Council (1924–1931), nominated member of the State Council of Ceylon (1936–1947), member for Colombo Central (1947–1950)

State Council of Ceylon (1931–1947)
 Mohamed Khalid Saldin (1870–1944), nominated member of the State Council of Ceylon (1931–1935)

House of Representatives (Ceylon) (1947–1972)
 M. P. Drahaman (born November 5, 1889, Colombo, d. 1963, Mecca) was a Ceylonese Malay medical doctor and politician. He was the leader of the All Ceylon Malay Congress, and was appointed as Member of Parliament in 1956 and 1960.
 Baba Zahiere Lye (1900–1969), nominated member of the Parliament of Ceylon (1963–1965)
 M. D. Kitchilan, appointed member of the Senate of Ceylon (1965–1971)

National State Assembly of Sri Lanka (1972–1978)

Parliament of Sri Lanka (1978–present)
 M. H. Amit, nominated member of the Parliament of Sri Lanka (1989)

Judges & Lawyers

Judges
 Justice Maas Thajoon Akbar KC (June 15, 1880 – April 22, 1944) – He was the 58th (01st Muslim) Justices of the Supreme Court of Sri Lanka. He was the 08th (01st Muslim) Solicitor General of Sri Lanka. He was appointed as the Solicitor General in 1925 and held the office until 1928.

Lawyers

Physicians
 Dr. A R Deane (1918–2003)
 Dr. Anvar Hamdani

Defence

Sri Lanka Army
 Brigadier T. S. B. Sally – Brigadier Tuan Samayraan Buhary Sally, SLSR was a Sri Lankan military leader, he was the Chief of Staff of the Sri Lanka Army and was the first Malay and Muslim in the country to reach this rank and post.
 Brigadier T. M. Bohoran – SLE was a Sri Lankan military leader, he was the General Officer Commanding 56 Offensive Infantry Division during operations Jaya Sikurui, He was also the Commander, Engineer Brigade, Commanding Officer 1 Field Engineer Regiment and Aide De Camp (ADC) to Lt Gen GADGN Senewiratne, 10th Commander of the Sri Lanka Army.
 Brigadier T. B. Morseth RWP RSP – GR was a Sri Lankan military leader, He commanded the prestigious 3rd Gajaba Regiment and 8th Gajaba Regiment during many offensive operations conducted in the North & East in Sri Lanka. He was also the Centre Commandant of Gajaba Regiment and Commandant, Army Training Centre, Maduru Oya before migrating to Australia in 2005.
 Major General Tuan Fadyl Meedin RSP (Twice), Ldmc, MMS (Osm. Ind), MIT (C.Sturt, Aus), CSMP, M.ISMI (UK), 6th Colonel Commandant, Sri Lanka Signal Corps, 1st Chief Signal Officer, Chief Innovations Officer, 14th Signal Brigade Commander of Sri Lanka Army, 8th Centre Commandant, Sri Lanka Signal Corps and 1st Chief Controller, Centre for Research & Development, Ministry of Defence, Sri Lanka. Most senior rank signaller among Malays to have ever served the armed forces in Sri Lanka. He was promoted to the substantive rank of Major General with effective from 28 February 2011. He is also the 1st Sri Lankan CSMP Laureate from ISMI, UK. 
 Major General M. Z. R. Sallay – He held the appointment of Colonel Commandant of the Sri Lanka Army Ordnance Corps from 2009 to 2014. He was promoted to the rank of Major General on 28 November 2013 marking the date in Sri Lankan Malay history books as the day our community produced its first ever Major General of the Sri Lanka Army. 
 Major General Tuan Suraj Bangsajayah RWP RSP VSV USP ndu, Colonel of the Regiment, Gemunu Regiment, Commandant, Sri Lanka Army Volunteer Force, Director General General Staff, Army Headquarters, Commandant, Infantry Training Centre, Minneriya, Deputy General Officer Commanding, 58 Infantry (Offensive) Division during the last phase of the operation conducted to liberate North & East from LTTE terrorists. 
Colonel Tuan Rizly Meedin (27 July 1966 – 30 October 2005) General Staff Officer 1 of the Military Intelligence Directorate. (Rana Sura Padakkama (RSP), Sri Lanka Army 50th Anniversary Medal, Sri Lanka Armed Forces Long Service Medal, 50th Independence Anniversary Commemoration Medal, Deshaputhra Sammanaya, North and East Operational Medal, Purna Bhumi Padakkama, Vadamarachchi Operational Medal and Riviresa Campaign Service Medal.) Former Commanding Officer of the 2nd Battalion Military Intelligence Corps. (MIC)
 Colonel Tuan Nizam Muthaliff RWP, MI (July 12, 1966 – May 31, 2005) (O/60727) was the former Commanding Officer of the 1st Battalion Military Intelligence Corps. (MIC)
 Colonel Tuan Nizam (Raja) Dane RWP, (Killed in action – June 24, 1997 during Operation Jaya Sikurui) was the former Commanding Officer of the 10th Battalion, Vijayabahu Infantry Regiment of the Sri Lanka Army
 Captain Akmal Hamza ( Sinha Regiment )
 Captain B.Haroon Preena ( Mechanized Infantry Regiment )

Sri Lanka Air Force
 Wing Commander Retired Tuan Rajioon Singalaxana (RCyAF/SLAF) 
 Wing Commander Faizal Cassiere died in SLAF Shanxi Y8 aircraft crash at Iyakachchi 5 July 1992
 Flying Officer A. M. A Packeer died in Aircraft Crash on 22 January 1997
 Sergeant T. H. Sherifdeen died in Aircraft Crash on 29 April 1995

Sri Lanka Navy
 Captain TP Marso (Logistics Branch & Chairman Sri Lanka Navy Muslim Association 2016 – 2021)
 Lieutenant Amrit Singalaxana (Navy Engineering)
 Lieutenant Tuan Azwan Cader (Navy Intelligence)
 Captain Tuan Zackhairoon Bagus (Deceased 3 March 2020)
 Lieutenant Commander Shanthi Bahar – a pioneer to lead a small team of specially trained sailors seeking LTTE hideouts in the jungles and thickets of Trincomalee. Killed in action.

Sri Lanka Police

Pre 1947
 Inspector of Police (IP) B.H.Dole 
 Police Constable (PC) Sabhan – The origin of annual Police Day commemoration dates back to March 21, 1864, when Constable Sabhan died of gunshot injuries received during a police raid to apprehend the notorious bandit Utuwankande Sura Saradiel.

Post 1947
 Senior Deputy Inspector General of Police (SDIG) M.R. Latiff –  11th (01st Muslim & Malay) Commandant of the Special Task Force
 Deputy Inspector General of Police (DIG) B. M. N. Jurangpathy
 Deputy Inspector General of Police (DIG) T. M. Miskin
 Deputy Inspector General of Police (DIG) Akbar Packir
 Senior Superintendent of Police (SSP) Baba Ram Dole (Son of Inspector of Police B.H.Dole) – The first Muslim & Malay to reach the rank of Superintendent of Police. He joined the Police as a young Sub Inspector in the year 1934 during the British rule. He retired in the year 1972 as the Head of the Colombo Crimes Division.
 Senior Superintendent of Police (SSP) Baba Mahil Dole (Son of Chief Inspector Baba Muhajireen Dole, Grandson of Inspector of Police B.H.Dole)
 Senior Superintendent of Police (SSP) T. M. B. Mahath
 Senior Superintendent of Police (SSP) M. C. Mahamoor 
 Sergeant Tuan Asikun

Sports

Cricket
 Baba Roshan Jurangpathy (born 25 June 1967) is a Sri Lankan former Test cricketer. He played his debut test against India in 1985 at Asgiriya Stadium.
 Tillakaratne Dilshan is a Sri Lankan former Test cricketer and captain.
 Tillakaratne Sampath is a Sri Lankan former first class cricketer.

Football
 Thuwan Raheem (born 11 September 1979) is a Sri Lankan footballer in the Sri Lanka national football team
   Roomie Packeerally. B.R.A.Preena

Rugby Football
 Fazil Marija (born 2 December 1985) – Served as the Vice Captain of the Sri Lanka National Rugby Teams of 2011 and 2013

Swimming
 Ghefari Dulapanda   – He captained the Sri Lankan swimming team for eight years from 1992 – 2000
 Kimiko Raheem
 Machiko Raheem
 Mayumi Raheem

Other
 G. S. B. Rani – actress, singer, politician and media personality
 Ramzi Rahaman – fashion designer
 Umara Sinhawansa – singer
 Umaria Sinhawansa – singer
  Yahiya ( Sri Lanka Army ) Boxer

See also
 Sri Lankan Malays
 Sri Lankan Malay language
 Islam in Sri Lanka
 Sri Lankan Moors
 List of Sri Lankan Moors
 Indian Moors
 Memons in Sri Lanka
 Malayisation
 List of Sri Lankans

References
 The Directory on Sri Lankan Malays (2008) 
 Careem, Tuan M. Zameer (2017). Persaudaraan (Brotherhood). Malay Life in Sri Lanka (2nd ed). Colombo: S Godage & Brothers. Print

Malays
 
Malays
Malays